The non-marine molluscs of Sweden are a part of the molluscan fauna of Sweden (wildlife of Sweden).

There are unknown species of gastropods (52 species of freshwater gastropods, unknown species of land gastropods) and 32 species of bivalves living in the wild—84 species of freshwater molluscs altogether.

Freshwater gastropods
Freshwater gastropods in Sweden include:

Neritidae
 Theodoxus fluviatilis (Linnaeus, 1758)

Viviparidae
 Viviparus contectus (Millet, 1813)
 Viviparus viviparus (Linnaeus, 1758)

Thiaridae
 Melanoides tuberculata (O. F. Müller, 1774) - non-indigenous

Bithyniidae
 Bithynia tentaculata (Linnaeus, 1758)
 Bithynia leachii (Sheppard, 1823)
 Bithynia transsilvanica (E. A. Bielz, 1853) - regionally extinct in Sweden

Hydrobiidae
 Potamopyrgus antipodarum (J. E. Gray, 1843) - non-indigenous
 Hydrobia ventrosa (Montagu, 1803)
 Hydrobia ulvae (Pennant, 1777)
 Hydrobia neglecta Muus, 1963

Amnicolidae
 Marstoniopsis scholtzi (A. Schmidt, 1856)

Valvatidae
 Valvata cristata O. F. Müller, 1774
 Valvata macrostoma Mörch, 1864 - Near Threatened in Sweden
 Valvata sibirica Middendorff, 1851 - Near Threatened in Sweden
 Valvata piscinalis (O. F. Müller, 1774)

Acroloxidae
 Acroloxus lacustris (Linnaeus, 1758)

Lymnaeidae
 Galba truncatula (O. F. Müller, 1774)
 Stagnicola palustris (O. F. Müller, 1774)
 Stagnicola fuscus (C. Pfeiffer, 1821)
 Stagnicola corvus (Gmelin, 1791)
 Omphiscola glabra (O. F. Müller, 1774) - Vulnerable in Sweden
 Radix auricularia (Linnaeus, 1758)
 Radix peregra (O. F. Müller, 1774)
 Radix ovata (Draparnaud, 1805)
 Myxas glutinosa (O. F. Müller, 1774) - Near Threatened in Sweden
 Lymnaea stagnalis (Linnaeus, 1758)
 Pseudosuccinea columella (Say, 1817) - non-indigenous

Physidae
 Physa fontinalis (Linnaeus, 1758)
 Physella acuta (Draparnaud, 1805) - non-indigenous
 Physella heterostropha (Say, 1817) - non-indigenous
 Aplexa hypnorum (Linnaeus, 1758) - Near Threatened in Sweden

Planorbidae
 Planorbarius corneus (Linnaeus, 1758)
 Planorbella duryi (Wetherby, 1879) - non-indigenous
 Ferrissia clessiniana (Jickeli, 1882) - non-indigenous, synonym: Ferrissia wautieri (Mirolli, 1960)
 Planorbis planorbis (Linnaeus, 1758)
 Planorbis carinatus O. F. Müller, 1774
 Anisus leucostoma (Millet, 1813)
 Anisus spirorbis (Linnaeus, 1758) - Data Deficient
 Anisus vortex (Linnaeus, 1758)
 Anisus vorticulus (Troschel, 1834) - Critically Endangered in Sweden
 Bathyomphalus contortus (Linnaeus, 1758)
 Gyraulus albus (O. F. Müller, 1774)
 Gyraulus acronicus (A. Férussac, 1807)
 Gyraulus chinensis (Dunker, 1848) - non-indigenous
 Gyraulus laevis (Alder, 1838) - Endangered in Sweden
 Gyraulus parvus (Say, 1817) - non-indigenous
 Gyraulus riparius (Westerlund, 1865)
 Gyraulus crista (Linnaeus, 1758)
 Hippeutis complanatus (Linnaeus, 1758)
 Segmentina nitida (O. F. Müller, 1774) - Vulnerable in Sweden
 Ancylus fluviatilis O. F. Müller, 1774

Land gastropods
Land gastropods in Sweden include:

Pupillidae
 Pupilla pratensis (Clessin, 1871)

Punctidae
 Punctum pygmaeum

Vertiginidae
 Vertigo lilljeborgi

Milacidae
 Milax gagates (Draparnaud, 1801)

Vitrinidae

Boettgerillidae
 Boettgerilla pallens Simroth, 1912

Limacidae
 Limax maximus Linnaeus, 1758
 Limax cinereoniger Wolf, 1803
 Limacus flavus (Linnaeus, 1758)
 Malacolimax tenellus (O. F. Müller, 1774)
 Lehmannia marginata (O. F. Müller, 1774)
 Lehmannia valentiana (A. Férussac, 1822)

Agriolimacidae
 Deroceras agreste (Linnaeus, 1758)
 Deroceras laeve (O. F. Müller, 1774)
 Deroceras reticulatum (O. F. Müller, 1774)
 Deroceras sturanyi (Simroth, 1894)
 Deroceras panormitanum (Lessona & Pollonera, 1882)

Arionidae
 Arion rufus (Linnaeus, 1758)
 Arion lusitanicus J. Mabille, 1868
 Arion fuscus (O. F. Müller, 1774)
 Arion circumscriptus Johnston, 1828
 Arion fasciatus (Nilsson, 1823)
 Arion silvaticus Lohmander, 1937
 Arion distinctus J. Mabille, 1868
 Arion intermedius Normand, 1852
 Arion ater

Bradybaenidae

Helicodontidae

Hygromiidae
 Trochulus hispidus (Linnaeus, 1758)

Helicidae
 Cepaea hortensis (O. F. Müller, 1774)
 Cepaea nemoralis (Linnaeus, 1758)

Freshwater bivalves
Freshwater gastropods in Sweden include:

Margaritiferidae
 Margaritifera margaritifera (Linnaeus, 1758) - Vulnerable in Sweden

Unionidae
 Unio pictorum (Linnaeus, 1758)
 Unio tumidus Philipsson, 1788
 Unio crassus Philipsson, 1788 - Endangered in Sweden
 Anodonta anatina (Linnaeus, 1758)
 Anodonta cygnea (Linnaeus, 1758)
 Pseudanodonta complanata (Rossmässler, 1835) - Near Threatened in Sweden

Sphaeriidae
 Sphaerium corneum (Linnaeus, 1758)
 Sphaerium nucleus (S. Studer, 1820)
 Sphaerium nitidum Clessin, 1876
 Musculium lacustre (O. F. Müller, 1774)
 Pisidium amnicum (O. F. Müller, 1774)
 Pisidium dilatatum Westerlund, 1897 - Near Threatened in Sweden, synonym: Pisidium subtilestriatum Lindholm, 1909
 Pisidium casertanum (Poli, 1791)
 Pisidium globulare Clessin, 1873
 Pisidium hinzi Kuiper, 1975 - Vulnerable in Sweden
 Pisidium nitidum Jenyns, 1832
 Pisidium personatum Malm, 1855
 Pisidium conventus Clessin, 1877
 Pisidium obtusale (Lamarck 1818)
 Pisidium henslowanum (Sheppard, 1823)
 Pisidium hibernicum Westerlund, 1894
 Pisidium lilljeborgii Clessin, 1886
 Pisidium supinum A. Schmidt, 1851 - Vulnerable in Sweden
 Pisidium waldeni Kuiper, 1975
 Pisidium tenuilineatum Stelfox, 1918 - Data Deficient
 Pisidium moitessierianum Paladilhe, 1866
 Pisidium subtruncatum Malm, 1855
 Pisidium pulchellum Jenyns, 1832
 Pisidium milium Held, 1836
 Pisidium pseudosphaerium J. Favre, 1927

Dreissenidae
 Dreissena polymorpha (Pallas, 1771) - non-indigenous

See also
Lists of molluscs of surrounding countries:
 List of non-marine molluscs of Norway
 List of non-marine molluscs of Finland
 List of non-marine molluscs of Denmark
 List of non-marine molluscs of Germany
 List of non-marine molluscs of Poland
 List of non-marine molluscs of Kaliningrad Oblast
 List of non-marine molluscs of Lithuania
 List of non-marine molluscs of Latvia
 List of non-marine molluscs of Estonia

References

Molluscs
Sweden
Sweden
Sweden